Love Today is a 2004 Telugu film directed by Aprudhan. The film stars Uday Kiran and debutante Divya Khosla.

Cast 

 Uday Kiran as Shiva 
 Divya Khosla as Parvatha Vardhini 
 Sunil as Dharma
 Devadarshini as Dharma's wife
 Srinivasa Reddy
 Babloo
 Suman Setty
 Raghunatha Reddy
 Tanikella Bharani
 Siva Parvathy
 Vindya as an item number

Production 
Divya Khosla, who starred opposite Salman Khan in the music video Zid Na Karo Ye Dil Ka Mamla Hai and in Reliance Communications mobile advertisement, was roped in to play the lead female opposite Uday Kiran.

Soundtrack  
Songs by Vidyasagar.
"Sunday"
"I Love You" - Tippu, Srilekha
"Oh Prema" - Shankar Mahadevan
"Side B" - Hariharan
"Walking"
"Cheppave" - Sadhana Sargam
"Aey Pilla"

Release 
The film released to mixed reviews. A critic from Idlebrain.com gave the film two point five out of five stars and wrote how the film feels lengthy. Additionally, the reviewer praised the techinal aspects of the film, the performances of Uday Kiran and the supporting cast especially Devadarshini stating how she "would be suitable for akka [sister] & vadina [sister-in-law] roles in Telugu films". A critic from Sify wrote that "Director Aprudhan has a very thin storyline as the film moves at a snail pace. Unfortunately Love Today has nothing new to offer and ultimately lacks any style or soul". A critic from Full Hyderabad wrote that "When the crux of the movie is about dealing with misunderstandings, they should've at least tried to show some remotely sensible reason for all the squabbles. With such an effort from the makers' side, the outcome is only ordinary".

References

External links 

2004 films
2000s Telugu-language films
Indian romantic drama films
2004 romantic drama films